Sven Teutenberg (born August 18, 1972, in Düsseldorf) is a German cyclist, who currently rides for German amateur team SG Kaarst.

He achieved a number of victories, especially in smaller races.

Teutenberg is the older brother of cyclist Ina-Yoko Teutenberg. He also has an older brother, Lars Teutenberg, who was also a professional cyclist. He was known as one of the best friends of Jan Ullrich.

Major results

1993
1st  Overall Circuit Franco-Belge
1st Stage 5 
1st Stage 3 Bayern Rundfahrt
1994
 Tour DuPont
1st Stages 2 & 9
1995
3rd Paris–Tours
1996
1st  Overall Rutas de América
1st Stages 1b & 7
1st Stage 9 Tour DuPont
1st Stage 8 Commonwealth Bank Classic
1st Stage 1 Ster ZLM Toer
5th GP de la Ville de Rennes
1997
1st Rund um Düren
1998
1st Prologue Rheinland-Pfalz Rundfahrt
2000
6th Overall Bayern Rundfahrt
1st Stage 1a
2001
2nd Trofeo Luis Puig
2nd Grand Prix de la Ville de Lillers
2002
8th Road race, UCI Road World Championships
2003
1st Stage 4 3-Länder-Tour
2006
5th Veenendaal–Veenendaal Classic

Grand Tour general classification results timeline

References

External links

1972 births
Living people
German male cyclists
Sportspeople from Düsseldorf
Cyclists from North Rhine-Westphalia